Ernest Chesneau (9 April 1833 – 24 February 1890) was a French art historian and critic.

Selected publications
 Le Mouvement moderne en peinture. Decamps, Paris, Panckoucke, 1861 ;
 La Peinture française au XIXe siècle : les chefs d’école, Paris, Didier, 1862 ;
 L’Art dans les résidences impériales. Compiègne, Paris, E. Panckoucke, 1863 ;
 L’Art et les artistes modernes en France et en Angleterre, Paris, Didier, 1864 ;
 Mme de La Vallière (1644-1710), Paris, Blaisot, 1864 ;
 Les Nations rivales dans l’art : peinture, sculpture ; L’art japonais ; De l’Influence des expositions internationales sur l’avenir de l’art, Paris, Didier, 1868 ;
 Notice sur G. Régamey, Paris, Librairie de l’art, 1879, 1 vol. (53 p.) : fig. ; gr. in-8 ;
 Peintres et statuaires romantiques, Paris, Charavay frères, 1880 ;
 Constant Dutilleux, 1807-1865, Paris, 1880, in-8° ;
 Le Statuaire J.-B. Carpeaux : sa vie et son œuvre, Paris, A. Quentin, 1880, in-8°, VIII-286 p., pl., fig. et portrait.

References 

1833 births
1890 deaths
French art historians
French art critics